AFI's 100 Years...100 Stars is the American Film Institute's list ranking the top 25 female and 25 male greatest screen legends of American film history and is the second list of the AFI 100 Years... series.

The list was unveiled through a CBS special on June 15, 1999, hosted by Shirley Temple (who is herself honored on the female legends list), with 50 then-current actors making the presentations.

AFI defines an "American screen legend" as "an actor or a team of actors with a significant screen presence in American feature-length films (films of 40 minutes or more) whose screen debut occurred in or before 1950, or whose screen debut occurred after 1950 but whose death has marked a completed body of work." In other words, the list generally honors actors recognized for their contributions to classical Hollywood cinema. Jurors selected the final lists from 250 female and 250 male nominees.

Sixteen female stars were born in the United States; the other nine are Vivien Leigh, born in India; Elizabeth Taylor, the United Kingdom; Audrey Hepburn, Belgium; Mary Pickford, Canada; Marlene Dietrich, Germany; Sophia Loren, Italy; Claudette Colbert, France; and Ingrid Bergman and Greta Garbo, Sweden.

Twenty-one male stars were born in the United States; the other four are Charlie Chaplin, Laurence Olivier and Cary Grant, who were born in the United Kingdom, and Edward G. Robinson, born in Romania.

At the time that the lists were unveiled, Gregory Peck, Katharine Hepburn, Marlon Brando, Elizabeth Taylor, Shirley Temple, Lauren Bacall, Kirk Douglas (the longest-lived star at 103) and Sidney Poitier were all still living, but they have since died.

List of 50 greatest screen legends: Top 25 Female and Top 25 Male stars

Nominees
The legends were chosen out of a list of 250 female and 250 male nominees. The adjoining reference gives the lists of the original selection.

With the death of Sidney Poitier in January 2022, all male living legends and nominees have now died.  There is one surviving female living legend, Sophia Loren (88), and 6 remaining female nominees: Ann Blyth (94), Claire Bloom (92), Mitzi Gaynor (91), Rita Moreno (91), Piper Laurie (91) and Margaret O'Brien (86). The most recent nominee to pass away is Gina Lollobrigida, aged 95, in January 2023.

The 250 female nominees
The Actresses that are part of the complete list of nominees are:

NOTE: Those listed in bold indicate that the star is still living.

The 250 male nominees
The Actors that are part of the complete list of nominees are:

Notes

References

External links 
 
 List of the 500 nominated star legends (Archive)
 List of the 50 winning legends

1999 in film
Stars
Lists of actors
Centennial anniversaries